A general election was held in Minneapolis on November 2, 2021. Minneapolis's mayor was up for election as well as all the seats on the City Council, the two elected seats on the Board of Estimate and Taxation, and all the seats on the Park and Recreation Board. Voters were able to rank up to three candidates for each office in order of preference. Additionally, there were three ballot measures on the ballot related to government structure, public safety, and rent control.

Mayor 

Incumbent Minnesota Democratic–Farmer–Labor Party (DFL) Mayor Jacob Frey sought re-election to a second term among a field of 16 candidates. He won with 56% of the vote in the second round of the rank-choice ballot.

City Council 

All 13 seats on the Minneapolis City Council were up for election. Each resident of Minneapolis could elect one city councilor in a single-member district. Because of re-districting, members were only elected for a two-year term instead of the usual four-year term. The DFL retained their supermajority, winning 12 of the 13 wards and over 85% of total votes cast. Cam Gordon, the council's sole Green Party member, lost to newcomer Robin Wonsley Worlobah. She became the DSA's first representative elected to the Minneapolis City Council.

Park and Recreation Board

Board of Estimate and Taxation 
The two elected seats on the Board of Estimate and Taxation were up for election. Steve Brandt and Samantha Pree-Stinson were elected from one citywide, at-large district via the single transferable vote.

Candidates

Results

Ballot measures

Question 1 
Question 1 would change the form of government of Minneapolis to an Executive Mayor-Legislative Council. It passed with 52% of the vote.

Question 2 

On November 2, 2021, voters in Minneapolis rejected the ballot measure with 80,506 or 56.2 percent of votes cast for "no" versus 62,813 or 43.8% of votes for "yes".

Question 3 
Question 3 permitted the Minneapolis City Council to enact rent control on private residential property. It passed with 53% of the vote.

See also
2020 Minneapolis park encampments

References

Minneapolis municipal
Government of Minneapolis
2020s in Minneapolis